Sid Richardson Bass (born April 9, 1942) is an American billionaire investor and philanthropist.

Early life
Sid Richardson Bass was born on April 9, 1942. His father, Perry Richardson Bass (died 2006), built an oil fortune with uncle, Sid W. Richardson. He graduated from Yale University in 1965, and also has a degree from the Stanford Graduate School of Business.

Career
Bass took control of the family business in 1968. His investments include oil and gas. Along with his father and two of his brothers, he was the largest shareholder in The Walt Disney Company from 1984 until after the stock market crash in 2001. Bass was forced to sell his Disney holdings as a result of a margin call.

In 2007, he had a net worth of US$3 billion.

In 2020, he was ranked No.359 in the Forbes 400 list of the richest people in America.

Philanthropy
Bass donated $20 million to Yale University for the study of humanities in 1990. In 2006, Bass and his second wife, Mercedes Bass, made a gift of $25 million to the Metropolitan Opera, at the time the largest individual gift in the company's history.

Personal life
His first wife was Anne Hendricks Bass. Their marriage produced 2 daughters, one being author Hyatt Bass, and ended in divorce in 1986.  In 1988, Bass married the Iranian socialite Mercedes Bass (the former Mercedes Kellogg, née Mercedes Tavacoli). This marriage ended in divorce in 2011, producing no children.

References

1942 births
Living people
People from Fort Worth, Texas
Businesspeople from Texas
Yale University alumni
Stanford Graduate School of Business alumni
American businesspeople in the oil industry
American billionaires